David Kent may refer to:

David Kent (politician) (1867–1930), Sinn Féin TD 1918–1927
David Kent (historian) (born 1941), historian and creator of the Australian Kent Music Report
David Kent (musician), past member of Hall & Oates band